Otávio Bulgarelli Didier (born 15 October 1984 in São Gonçalo do Sapucaí) is a former Brazilian cyclist.

Major results

2008
 1st Stage 5 Tour do Brasil
 3rd Pan American Road Race Championships
2009
 2nd Overall Tour de Québec
 3rd Overall Tour de Santa Catarina
 4th Overall Tour de Santa Catarina
 8th Overall Volta Ciclística Internacional do Rio Grande do Sul
2010
 9th Giro del Casentino
2012
 1st  National Road Race Championships
 7th Overall Vuelta a Guatemala
2013
 1st Overall Tour de Santa Catarina
1st Stages 4 & 5
2014
 6th Overall Volta Ciclística Internacional do Rio Grande do Sul

References

1984 births
Living people
Brazilian male cyclists
Brazilian road racing cyclists
21st-century Brazilian people
20th-century Brazilian people